The reformer Martin Luther, a prolific hymnodist, regarded music and especially hymns in German as important means for the development of faith.

Luther wrote songs for occasions of the liturgical year (Advent, Christmas, Purification, Epiphany, Easter, Pentecost, Trinity), hymns on topics of the catechism (Ten Commandments, Lord's Prayer, creed, baptism, confession, Eucharist), paraphrases of psalms, and other songs. Whenever Luther went out from pre-existing texts, here listed as "text source" (bible, Latin and German hymns), he widely expanded, transformed and personally interpreted them.

Luther worked on the tunes, sometimes modifying older tunes, in collaboration with Johann Walter. Hymns were published in the Achtliederbuch, in Walter's choral hymnal Eyn geystlich Gesangk Buchleyn (Wittenberg) and the Erfurt Enchiridion (Erfurt) in 1524, and in the Klugsches Gesangbuch, among others. For more information, see Martin Luther § Hymnodist.

List

Other hymns sometimes ascribed to Luther but not listed above include "All Her und Lob soll Gottes sein", "Unser große Sünde und schwere Missetat", "Christ ist erstanden", and "Nun laßt uns den Leib begraben".

See also 
 Martin Luther § Hymnodist
 Hymnody of continental Europe § Reformation

References

Further reading 
 Otto Schlißke, Handbuch der Lutherlieder, Göttingen 1948.

External links 
 Kirchenlieder von Martin Luther – numbered by Evangelisches Gesangbuch 
 Martin Luther at Hymnary.org
 Chronological catalog of Luther's life events, letters, and works with citations, 478 pages, 5.45 MB LettersLuther4.doc

16th century in music
 *